Massimo Ghirotto (born 25 June 1961, in Boara Pisani) is an Italian former road bicycle racer.

Major results

1987
1st, Trofeo Baracchi
1st, Trofeo Matteotti
1st, Coppa Placci
1st, Stage 10, Tour de Suisse
1988
1st, GP Industria & Artigianato di Larciano
1st, Stage 13, Tour de France
1989
1st, Stage 6, Vuelta a España
1990
1st, Giro dell'Umbria
1st, Stage 9, Tour de France
1991
1st, Stage 4, Giro del Trentino
1st, Stage 9, Giro d'Italia
1992
1st, Giro del Veneto
1st, Tre Valli Varesine
1st, Wincanton Classic
1993
1st, Tre Valli Varesine
1st, Stage 20, Giro d'Italia
Combativity award, Tour de France
1994
1st, Vuelta a los Valles Mineros
1st, Stage 19, Giro d'Italia

External links 
Palmarès by cyclingbase.com 
Palmarès by museociclismo.it 

1961 births
Italian male cyclists
Living people
Italian Giro d'Italia stage winners
Italian Tour de France stage winners
Italian Vuelta a España stage winners
Cyclists from the Province of Padua
Tour de Suisse stage winners